The 1894 New South Wales colonial election was held on 17 July 1894 for all of the 125 seats in the 16th New South Wales Legislative Assembly and it was conducted in single-member constituencies with a first past the post voting system. Section 23 (1) of the Parliamentary Electorates and Elections Act of 1893 conferred a right to vote on 'every male person, being a natural born [British] subject, who shall have resided or had his principal
place of abode in New South Wales for a continuous period of one year'. The 15th parliament of New South Wales was dissolved on 25 June 1894 by the Governor, Sir Robert Duff, on the advice of the Premier, George Dibbs.

This election saw the elimination of multi-member districts. At the previous election there had been 20 two-member districts, 10 three-member districts, and 9 four-member districts. Their elimination also saw the Assembly reduced in size from 141 to 125 members. Also, for the first time, the election was conducted on the one day.

Although he had lost control of the Assembly, Dibbs did not resign until after parliament had reconvened, when the Governor forced his hand.

Key dates

Results

{{Australian elections/Title row
| table style = float:right;clear:right;margin-left:1em;
| title        = New South Wales colonial election, 17 July 1894
| house        = Legislative Assembly
| series       = New South Wales colonial election
| back         = 1891
| forward      = 1895
| enrolled     = 255,802
| total_votes  = 200,956
| turnout %    = 78.56
| turnout chg  = +19.48
| informal     = 3,310
| informal %   = 1.62
| informal chg = −0.38
}}

|}

Retiring members

See also
 Candidates of the 1894 New South Wales colonial election
 Members of the New South Wales Legislative Assembly, 1894–1895

References

Elections in New South Wales
1894 elections in Australia
1890s in New South Wales
July 1894 events